Chernogorsk (Khakas: , Xaratas) is a town in the Republic of Khakassia, Russia. Population:

History
During the Soviet era, a "corrective labor camp" was located here.

Administrative and municipal status
Within the framework of administrative divisions, it is, together with the work settlement of Prigorsk, incorporated as the Town of Chernogorsk—an administrative unit with the status equal to that of the districts. As a municipal division, the Town of Chernogorsk is incorporated as Chernogorsk Urban Okrug.

References

Notes

Sources

External links
Official website of Chernogorsk 
Chernogorsk Business Directory 

Cities and towns in Khakassia
Monotowns in Russia